Scott Street Pavilion is a historic park pavilion located in Columbian Park at Lafayette, Tippecanoe County, Indiana.  It was built in 1899, and is a -story, rectangular, wood-frame building.  It is sheathed in clapboard siding and has a hipped roof that extends to form a verandah on all sides.

It was listed on the National Register of Historic Places in 1984.

References

Event venues on the National Register of Historic Places in Indiana
Buildings and structures completed in 1899
Buildings and structures in Lafayette, Indiana
National Register of Historic Places in Tippecanoe County, Indiana